Sergey Borisenko (born May 28, 1971) is a retired male freestyle swimmer from Kazakhstan. He competed in two consecutive Summer Olympics for his native country, starting in 1996 (Atlanta, Georgia). His best Olympic result was finishing in 21st place at the 2000 Summer Olympics in the Men's 4 × 100 m Freestyle Relay event, alongside Andrey Kvasov, Pavel Sidorov, and Igor Sitnikov.

External links
 
 sports-reference

1971 births
Living people
Sportspeople from Karaganda
Kazakhstani male freestyle swimmers
Olympic swimmers of Kazakhstan
Swimmers at the 1996 Summer Olympics
Swimmers at the 2000 Summer Olympics
Asian Games medalists in swimming
Asian Games silver medalists for Kazakhstan
Asian Games bronze medalists for Kazakhstan
Swimmers at the 1994 Asian Games
Swimmers at the 1998 Asian Games
Medalists at the 1994 Asian Games
Medalists at the 1998 Asian Games
Kazakhstani people of Russian descent
20th-century Kazakhstani people